"Everything Happens For The Best" is a song written by Billie Holiday.

Recording session
Session #35: New York, March 21, 1939 on the Vocalion label, Billie Holiday & Her Orchestra with ‘Hot Lips’ Page (trumpet), Tab Smith, Kenneth Hollon, Stanley Payne (saxophone), Kenny Kersey (piano), Jimmy McLin (guitar), John Williams (bass) Eddie Dougherty (drums), Billie Holiday (vocals).

The lyrics were written by Scott Billington and Lindsay Ellison.

References

1939 songs
Billie Holiday songs
Songs written by Billie Holiday